Maxayn Lewis is an American soul singer, musician, songwriter, and producer. She began her career in the 1960s, under her birth name Paulette Parker, as member of the Ikettes in the Ike & Tina Turner Revue. In the 1970s, Lewis sang lead in the band Maxayn with her then-husband Andre Lewis. She was described as "a cross between Aretha Franklin and Roberta Flack." The group eventually morphed to Mandré.

Lewis is also a prolific backing vocalist. She has sung with various acts, including The Gap Band, Donna Summer, Ray Charles, Celine Dion, Johnny "Guitar" Watson, Bonnie Raitt, Simple Minds, Duran Duran, Smokey Robinson, Ricky Martin, and Britney Spears.

Life and career 
Lewis was born Paulette Parker, the first of four children to Emzie and Lorene Parker in Tulsa, Oklahoma. Growing up in Greenwood, she listened to Duke Ellington, Muddy Waters, Mahalia Jackson, Sarah Vaughan, and Ella Fitzgerald. In the fifth grade, Parker created an all-female singing group called The Continentals.

She became a conservatory-trained pianist and attended Oklahoma State University where she studied sociology and psychology. Parker left the school after she was assaulted by a white male on campus. She became depressed after the incident, but soon she was offered an opportunity to sing as part of a nightclub act with a white male vocalist, Karl Day, booked as "Night and Day".

While Parker was performing at The Alley nightclub, she received a call from Ike Turner to set up an audition for a position as an Ikette. She auditioned for him when Ike & Tina Turner were in Independence, Kansas for a concert in 1967, and was hired on the spot. Turner met with her parents to get their blessings to go on tour. Parker spent over a year as an Ikettes and credits the Turners, particularly Ike Turner who she described as an "excellent businessman," for educating her on show business. "We were really well paid. Ike would read the contracts to us and tell us what a rider was. He asked 'Do you understand?' He would teach us what each part of the contract meant, so that we were all in it together," she said.

After her tenure as an Ikette, she embarked on a blues festival tour with Bobby "Blue" Bland. She released two singles under her birth name on Duke Records in 1969. Through Bland's bandleader, Ernie Fields Jr., Lewis met her husband musician Andre Lewis. She declined the chance to be produced by Donny Hathaway, opting to form a band with Andre. Now going by the name Maxayn Lewis, their band was named after her, Maxayn. The name Maxayn came from her uncle who called her goddess of the wind when she sang. She said: "I'm from Oklahoma so Native culture was always big. In the Mayan culture there was a Goddess of the Wind named Maxayn." Inspired by Tina Turner, she "wanted to have one name, like Tina, that one-name identity." The band Maxayn consisted of her singing lead, Andre Lewis (synthesizers), Marlo Henderson (guitar), and Emry Thomas (drums). They issued three albums on Capricorn Records: Maxayn (1972), Mindful (1973, US R&B  No. 43), and Bail Out for Fun! (1974). The band moved to Manticore Records in 1975 and were working on a fourth album when issues with the label caused them to abandon the project. Andre signed to Motown and released three disco albums under the name Mandré. Lewis contributed songwriting to his albums.

Lewis later co-wrote "So Much More" by Ramsey Lewis and "We Belong Together" by Rockie Robbins, both songs reached the Billboard R&B chart. Lewis toured as a backing vocalist with Gino Vannelli, Donna Summer, and Rufus. She provided background vocals for the soundtrack of the film Grease (1978). She also sang backup on albums for Steve Marriott, Sammy Hagar, The Gap Band, Rosanne Cash, Rita Coolidge, B.B. King, and Namie Amuro. She sang the track "Turn You On" on the soundtrack of the film Peeples (2013). Lewis performed most of the singing for Ma Rainey (played by Viola Davis) in the film Ma Rainey's Black Bottom (2020).<ref>{{Cite magazine|last=Hoffman|first=Jordan|date=December 18, 2020|title=How Branford Marsalis Found 'Ma Raineys Sound|url=https://www.vanityfair.com/hollywood/2020/12/ma-raineys-black-bottom-branford-marsalis-interview|access-date=2020-12-23|magazine=Vanity Fair|language=en-us}}</ref>

For a while Lewis lived in Tokyo; she currently lives in Los Angeles.

 Discography 

 Singles 

 1969: "(Gimme Back) My Love" / "Should I Let Him Go" (Duke 451)
 1969: "I Pity The Fool" / "Driving Wheel" (Duke 455)

 Backing vocal credits 

 1972: High Voltage – High Voltage1973: D. J. Rogers – D. J. Rogers
 1975: Bonnie Raitt – Home Plate
 1976: Steve Marriott – Marriott1976: Sammy Hagar – Nine on a Ten Scale1977: Bonnie Raitt – Sweet Forgiveness1977: Van Morrison – A Period Of Transition 1978: Tina Turner – Rough 1978: Grease (Original Motion Picture Soundtrack) 1979: Billy Preston – Late At Night
 1979: Rufus – Numbers
1979: Bonnie Raitt – The Glow'
 1979: Lowell George – Thanks I'll Eat It Here
 1980: The Gap Band – The Gap Band III
 1981: Rosanne Cash – Seven Year Ache
 1982: Rosanne Cash – Somewhere in the Stars
 1982: The Gap Band – Gap Band IV
 1983: The Gap Band – Gap Band V: Jammin'
 1984: Bobby Bland – You've Got Me Loving You
 1985: Morris Day – Color Of Success
 1987: Smokey Robinson – One Heartbeat
 1987: Donna Summer – All Systems Go
1987: Morris Day – Daydreaming
1987: Tower of Power – Power
1988: Brenda Russell – Get Here 
1990: Gino Vannelli – Inconsolable Man
1992: Rita Coolidge – Love Lessons
1993: B.B. King – Blues Summit
1993: Ray Charles – My World
1994: Johnny "Guitar" Watson – Bow Wow
1994: Kathy Troccoli – Kathy Troccoli
1994: Chanté Moore – A Love Supreme
1995: Duran Duran – Thank You
1995: Simple Minds – Good News from the Next World
1995: Ricky Martin – A Medio Vivir
1996: Celine Dion – Falling into You
1997: Boney James - Sweet Thing
1999: The Gap Band – Y2K: Funkin' Till 2000 Comz
2000: Namie Amuro – Genius 2000
2000: The Doobie Brothers – Sibling Rivalry 
2000: Namie Amuro – Break the Rules
2001: Rollins Band – Nice
2001: Britney Spears – Britney
2002: Les McCann – Pump It Up
2004: Tift Merritt – Tambourine
2005: Tift Merritt – Stray Paper
2007: Jerry Lee Lewis – Last Man Standing Live
2007: Ai – Don't Stop Ai
2011: Jude Johnstone – Quiet Girl
2015: Ben Haenow – Ben Haenow 
2018: Jay-Bee & The Ultratone All-Stars – Life ain't got no shortcuts
2019: Coco Montoya – Coming In Hot

Instrumental credits 

 1972: Maxayn – Maxayn
 1972: Labelle – Moon Shadow
 1973: Maxayn – Mindful
 1974: Maxayn – Bail Out For Fun!
 1979: Wornell Jones – You Are My Happiness
1983: Earth, Wind & Fire – Powerlight
1990: Pizzicato Five – Soft Landing On The Moon

References

External links 
 Maxayn Lewis Credits on AllMusic
 Maxayn Lewis Discography on Discogs

Living people
Musicians from Tulsa, Oklahoma
Singer-songwriters from Oklahoma
American rhythm and blues musicians
African-American women singer-songwriters
American women pianists
American soul singers
21st-century African-American women singers
American session musicians
Ike & Tina Turner members
Duke Records artists
Year of birth missing (living people)
African-American pianists
20th-century African-American women singers
Oklahoma State University alumni